This is a list of notable librarians and people who have advanced libraries and librarianship. Also included are people primarily notable for other endeavors, such as politicians and writers, who have also worked as librarians.

List of people known for contributions to the library profession

A-E

Ada Adler
Mary Eileen Ahern
Camila Alire
Edna Allyn – first librarian of the Hawaii State Library
Lester Asheim
Ashurbanipal II
Sarah B. Askew – pioneered the establishment of county libraries in the United States
Basil Atkinson
Derek Austin
Winifred Austin – pioneer of UK Library for the blind
Henriette Avram – MARC standards developer
Antoine Alexandre Barbier
John Davis Barnett – Canada
John J. Beckley – first Librarian of Congress; politician
Pura Belpré – librarian and author
Sanford Berman
Bob Berring – law librarian
John Carlo Bertot – library educator, researcher, editor of The Library Quarterly
Anastasius Bibliothecarius
James H. Billington – 13th librarian of Congress; historian
Robert H. Blackburn – former chief librarian of the University of Toronto
Thomas Bodley – founder of the Bodleian Library; English diplomat; 1545–1613
Arna Bontemps – author, bibliographer, and Fisk University librarian
Daniel J. Boorstin – 12th Librarian of Congress; historian
Marjorie Adele Blackistone Bradfield – as the Detroit Public Library's first African-American librarian, expanded its African-American literature collection
Aase Bredsdorff (1919–2017) – Danish library inspector specialising in children's literature
Wallace Breem – novelist and law librarian
Suzanne Briet
Frank J. Burgoyne (1858-1913) – author and librarian at Lambeth Libraries
Edward Dundas Butler – translator and senior librarian at the Department of Printed Books, British Museum
Lee Pierce Butler
Andrew Carnegie – Scottish-American industrialist and philanthropist who financed thousands of libraries around the world
Leon Carnovsky
Daniel J. Caron
Amalia Kahana-Carmon
Mayme Agnew Clayton
Cecilia Cleve (d. 1819) – Swedish pioneer librarian 
Morris L. Cohen – attorney, law librarian and professor of law at the University at Buffalo, University of Pennsylvania, Harvard Law School and Yale Law School
Marjorie Cotton – first professionally qualified children's librarian in New South Wales, Australia
Andrea Crestadoro
Charles Ammi Cutter
Laura Dallapiccola – Italian librarian and translator
John Cotton Dana (1856–1931)
Robert Darnton
Lorcan Dempsey
Beryl May Dent – mathematical physicist, technical librarian at Metropolitan-Vickers, honorary secretary of ASLIB branch
Melvil Dewey
William S. Dix
Leaonead Pack Drain-Bailey (1906-1983), Head of Library at West Virginia State University
Mollie E. Dunlap
Karl Franz Otto Dziatzko
Linda Eastman
Margaret A. Edwards
El Sayed Mahmoud El Sheniti – seminal figure in professional librarianship in Egypt
Theresa Elmendorf
Miriam Eshkol
Luther H. Evans – 10th Librarian of Congress
Woody Evans
Oliver Everett
Chinwe Nwogo Ezeani – first female University Librarian at University of Nigeria, Nsukka

F-M
Johann Albert Fabricius – bibliographer
Mary Cutler Fairchild – pioneer library educator
Adele M. Fasick – historical fiction writer, library science scholar, professor
David Ferriero – former M.I.T librarian and current Archivist of the United States
Anette Fischer (1946–1992) – librarian and human rights activist 
Herman H. Fussler
Elizabeth Futas – director of the University of Rhode Island's Graduate School of Library and Information Studies
Mary Virginia Gaver
Helen Thornton Geer – ALA Headquarters librarian, author, consultant, and professor
Johann Matthias Gesner – bibliographer
Kenneth MacLean Glazier Sr. – Canadian librarian
Eliza Atkins Gleason – first African American to receive doctorate of Library Science
Frederick R. Goff – incunabula scholar
Michael Gorman
Jan Gruter – scholar
Camilla Gryski
Helen E. Haines
Spencer Hall – librarian of the Athenaeum Club, London
Adelaide Hasse
Peter Havard-Williams – librarian educator
Carla Hayden – public librarian, former ALA President, 14th Librarian of Congress
Frances E. Henne 
Wolfgang Herrmann – librarian; member of Nazi Purification Committee
Caroline Hewins
John Howard Hickcox Sr.
Ted Hines
Cecil Hobbs – American scholar of Southeast Asian history, head of the Southern Asia Section of the Orientalia (now Asian) Division of the Library of Congress, a major contributor to scholarship on Asia and the development of South East Asian coverage in American library collections
Judith Hoffberg – art librarian
Zoia Horn – American librarian jailed for refusing to divulge information that violated her belief in intellectual freedom
Jean Blackwell Hutson – chief of Schomburg Center for Research in Black Culture
Thomas James
Anne Jarvis
Thomas Jefferson – sold his library to the Library of Congress<ref name="Liggio">Leonard Liggio, "The Life and Works of Thomas Jefferson" , The Locke Luminary Vol. II, No. 1 (Summer 1999) Part 3, George Mason University, accessed 14 February 2012</ref>
Charles Coffin Jewett
Carleton B. Joeckel
Virginia Lacy Jones – major figure in the integration of public and academic libraries
E.J. Josey
Gene Joseph – founding librarian of the Xwi7xwa Library at the University of British Columbia and the first librarian of First Nations descent in British Columbia, Canada
Muhammad Siddiq Khan
Mohammad Khatami – former President of Iran; previously Head of National Library of Iran
Frederick Kilgour
Anastasiya Kobzarenko 
Judith Krug – forty-year leader of the American Library Association's Office of Intellectual Freedom
Nadezhda Konstantinovna Krupskaya – wife of Lenin
Philip Larkin 
Louise Payson Latimer
Margaret Leiteritz – painter who based her work of scientific items which she knew as a librarian
Anne Grodzins Lipow – founder of Library Solutions Institute and Press
Audre Lorde – 20th-century US poet and activist
Eleanor Young Love – African-American librarian from Kentucky
Seymour Lubetzky
Roderick Samson Mabomba – Malawian librarian
Archibald MacLeish – 9th Librarian of Congress; Pulitzer Prize poet
Alison Macrina - founder of the Librarian Freedom Project
Patrick Magruder – 2nd Librarian of Congress; politician
Margaret Mann – library educator, particularly cataloging; founding faculty member at University of Michigan library science program (1926)
Allie Beth Martin
Harry S. Martin – former Head Librarian, Harvard Law Library
Kathleen de la Peña McCook – library scholar, public librarian, free speech advocate, and author 
John Silva Meehan – 4th Librarian of Congress
Florence Milnes – first BBC librarian
August Molinier – French historian
Eric Moon – editor of Library JournalAnne Carroll Moore – pioneering children's librarian
Everett T. Moore – freedom of information
Elizabeth Homer Morton – important contributions to development of Canadian libraries
Isadore Gilbert Mudge – edited Guide to Resource WorksL. Quincy Mumford – 11th Librarian of Congress
Ludovico Antonio Muratori – Italian librarian, archivist and historian

N-Z
Gerhard Brandt Naeseth – Norwegian-American Genealogical Center and Naeseth Library in Madison, Wisconsin
Makoto Nagao – 19th Director of National Diet Library of Japan; computer scientist specializing in digital library
Bonnie Nardi – information scientist
Gabriel Naudé
Malcolm Neesam - county music and audiovisual librarian for York, England
Howard Nixon
Margaret Cross Norton
Ekei Essien Oku – first Nigerian women chief librarian
Paul Otlet
John Henry Pyle Pafford
Antonio Panizzi – chief librarian of the British Museum library
Ingrid Parent – librarian at the University of British Columbia
Charles V. Park – librarian at Central Michigan University
Lotsee Patterson – librarian, educator, and founder of the American Indian Library Association
Nancy Pearl – librarian and author
Charles Peters – music cataloger at William & Gayle Cook Music Library, Indiana University
Mary Wright Plummer
Effie Louise Power
Herbert Putnam – 8th Librarian of Congress
S.R. Ranganathan – librarian and mathematician from India, known for his five laws of library science and the development of the colon classification
Fremont Rider
Jane, Lady Roberts
Charlemae Hill Rollins
Loriene Roy – first Native American president of the American Library Association 
Frances Clarke Sayers
Louis A. Schultheiss
Patricia G. Schuman
Marvin H. Scilken
Margaret Scoggin – young adult librarian
Marianne Scott
Ralph R. Shaw
Spencer Shaw (1916–2010) – American children's librarian and educator
Jesse Shera
Louis Shores
Regina Smith – librarian at Jenkins Law Library, a membership library in Philadelphia
Frances Lander Spain (1903-1999) – American Library Association President 1960-61
Ainsworth Rand Spofford – 6th Librarian of Congress
John G. Stephenson – 5th Librarian of Congress
Mari Strachan – 21st-century Welsh novelist in English
Suetonius – Roman historian and archivist
Peggy Sullivan
Don R. Swanson
Friedrich Sylburg – 16th-century German scholar
John Szabo – City Librarian of the Los Angeles Public Library and National Medal for Museum and Library Service recipient
Henry Richard Tedder – librarian of the Athenaeum Club, London
Florence Davy Thompson – founding librarian at the University of Manitoba
Louis Timothee – first American librarian
Arnulfo Trejo – U.S. Hispanic-American librarian
Gottfried van Swieten – Austrian Imperial librarian 1777-1803; introduced first card catalog
Eva Verona
Brian Campbell Vickery
Douglas Waples 
George Watterston – 3rd Librarian of Congress
Jessamyn West
Edwina Whitney – librarian at the University of Connecticut
John Wilkin – digital library management researcher
Ian E. Wilson
Louis Round Wilson
Patrick Wilson
Marianne Winder – librarian at the Wellcome Institute for the History of Medicine
Justin Winsor – Harvard University librarian
Mary Elizabeth Wood – promoted Western librarianship practices and programs in China
Lawrence C. Wroth – librarian at the John Carter Brown Library at Brown University
Ella Gaines Yates 
Victor Yngve
John Russell Young – 7th Librarian of Congress; journalist
Zenodotus – first superintendent of Library of Alexandria; scholar of the 3rd century BC
Shen Zurong – father of library science in China

One-time librarians noted for other accomplishments
Reinaldo Arenas – Cuban author
Ben Barkow
Roland Barthes – French writer and philosopher
Georges Bataille – French writer
Ludwig Bechstein – German author
Thomas Berger – American novelist
Hector Berlioz – French composer; librarian, Paris Conservatoire
Arna Bontemps – French artist
Jorge Luis Borges – author and poet
John Braine – British novelist 
Callimachus – poet
Roch Carrier – novelist
Lewis Carroll – author
Giacomo Casanova
Isaac Casaubon
Cassiodorus
Beverly Cleary – novelist
Joanna Cole – children's book author and librarian
Ina Coolbrith – poet and librarian
Frank Coombs – U.S. politician; State Librarian of California, 1898-1899
Gratia Countryman – Minneapolis librarian
Pierre François le Courayer – 18th-century theologian
Evelyn Crowell – librarian, author, speaker, activist, and community organizer
Harinath De – linguist
John Dee – Renaissance magician
A. Brian Deer – librarian from Kahnawake who developed a library classification system that gave rise to the Brian Deer Classification System
Hal Draper
Marcel Duchamp
Will Durant – historian
Eratosthenes
Frank Ferko – composer
Benjamin Franklin
Stephen Gaselee – diplomat
Edmund Gosse
Ed Greenwood – author
Francis Hayman – English artist
Elizabeth Heaps
Edward Singleton Holden – U.S. astronomer
J. Edgar Hoover – first director of the Federal Bureau of Investigation
David Hume – philosopher
Hypatia (c. 350–370 – March 415)
Mohammad Khatami – Iranian president and scholar
Annette Curtis Klause – author of children's books
Stanley Kunitz – former United States Poet Laureate; editor of Wilson Library Bulletin'', 1927-1943
Lao Tsu
Madeleine L'Engle – 20th-century novelist
Gottfried Wilhelm von Leibniz – mathematician and philosopher
Gotthold Ephraim Lessing – German playwright and poet
Wilhelm Lexis – German economist
Li Dazhao – Chinese revolutionary politician
Audre Lorde – 20th-century US poet and activist
Archibald MacLeish – author; Librarian of Congress, 1939-1944
Mao Zedong – Chinese revolutionary politician
Alan Noel Latimer Munby – English author
Vaunda Micheaux Nelson – author and librarian
Andre Norton – science-fiction author
Walter A. O'Brien – U.S. politician; commissioned original version of the song "Charlie on the M.T.A."
Christopher Okigbo – Nigerian poet
Major Owens – U.S. House of Representatives (D-NY)
Andrew K. Pace – author
Coventry Patmore – 19th-century UK poet
Kit Pearson – Canadian writer; winner of the 1997 Governor General's Award for English language children's literature
Benjamin Peirce – logician
Per Petterson – Norwegian author
Charles Pickering
Marcel Proust – French author
Philip Pullman – fantasy novelist
Ken Roberts – author
Greg Dean Schmitz – online film journalist
Eleanor Roosevelt Seagraves – granddaughter of Franklin D. Roosevelt
Sima Qian – Chinese historian
Lynne Stewart – American lawyer
June Tabor – British singer
Elizabeth Taylor
Edward J. Thomas – scholar of Buddhism
Anne Tyler – novelist
Wallace Van Jackson – American librarian and civil rights activist
Angus Wilson – novelist

Librarians noted as spouses of national leaders
Laura Bush – served as First Lady of the United States
Ingrid Carlsson – wife of Ingvar Carlsson
Miriam Eshkol

See also

List of fictional librarians
List of female librarians
List of libraries

References

 

it:Bibliotecario
pt:Anexo:Lista de bibliotecários